Ralph Hill (born November 10, 1949) is a former NFL football player with the New York Giants during the 1970s, playing in the center position.

References

New York Giants players
Living people
1949 births
Players of American football from Chicago